Charaxes karkloof, the Karkloof emperor, is a butterfly of the family Nymphalidae. It is found in South Africa.

The wingspan is 45–55 mm in males and 50–60 mm in females. Flight period is from October to June.

Larvae feed on Ochna arborea, Ochna natalitia, and Ochna serrulata.
Notes on the biology of karkloof are provided by Pringle et al (1994)

Similar species
Charaxes ethalion  and   Charaxes  pondoensis

Taxonomy
Charaxes karkloof is a member of the large species group Charaxes etheocles

Subspecies
Listed alphabetically.
C. k. capensis van Someren, 1966 .(South Africa: Eastern Cape Province)
C. k. karkloof van Someren & Jackson, 1957 (South Africa: KwaZulu-Natal, Eastern Cape Province)
C. k. trimeni Rydon, 1994 (South Africa: Western Cape Province to Saasveld, and Hoogekraal Pass near George)

Etymology
From the type locality Karkloof in Natal

References

Victor Gurney Logan Van Someren, 1966 Revisional notes on African Charaxes (Lepidoptera: Nymphalidae). Part III. Bulletin of the British Museum (Natural History) (Entomology)45-101.

External links
Charaxes karkloof images  at Consortium for the Barcode of Life
Charaxes karkloof karkloof images at BOLD
Charaxes karkloof capensis images at BOLD

karkloof
Butterflies described in 1957
Endemic butterflies of South Africa